Charadra, also Charadrus or Charadros (Χάραδρος), was a town of ancient Epirus, situated on the road from Ambracus to the strait of Actium. It is also mentioned in a fragment of Ennius: "Mytilenae est pecten Charadrumque apud Ambraciai."

Charadra is located near the Kastri at Palaia Philippias.

References

See also
List of cities in ancient Epirus

Populated places in ancient Epirus
Former populated places in Greece